Statistics of JSL Cup in the 1988 season.

Overview
It was contested by 28 teams, and Nissan Motors won the championship.

Results

1st round
Nissan Motors 7-0 Osaka Gas
Yomiuri 5-0 Cosmo Oil
Hitachi 3-1 Kofu
Mitsubishi Motors 4-1 Kawasaki Steel
Fujita Industries 3-0 Fujitsu
Yamaha Motors 3-0 Teijin
Mazda 2-1 NTT Kansai
Toshiba 1-0 Tanabe Pharmaceuticals
Furukawa Electric 1-0 Nippon Steel
Yanmar Diesel 4-0 Fujieda City Office
Matsushita Electric 0-0 (PK 3–4) NTT Kanto
Toyota Motors 5-0 Toho Titanium

2nd round
NKK 1-3 Nissan Motors
Yomiuri 1-0 Hitachi
Mitsubishi Motors 2-1 Fujita Industries
Yamaha Motors 0-2 All Nippon Airways
Honda 1-1 (PK 3–4) Mazda
Toshiba 3-2 Furukawa Electric
Yanmar Diesel 1-1 (PK 5–4) NTT Kanto
Toyota Motors 2-3 Sumitomo Metals

Quarterfinals
Nissan Motors 1-0 Yomiuri
Mitsubishi Motors 2-1 All Nippon Airways
Mazda 0-0 (PK 1–4) Toshiba
Yanmar Diesel 5-1 Sumitomo Metals

Semifinals
Nissan Motors 2-0 Mitsubishi Motors
Toshiba 1-0 Yanmar Diesel

Final
Nissan Motors 3-0 Toshiba
Nissan Motors won the championship

References
 

JSL Cup
League Cup